Jefferson José Rodrigues de Oliveira, known as Eusébio (born September 22, 1985, in Fortaleza) is a Brazilian footballer, currently playing for Atlético Goianiense, on loan from Ceará.

Career

In 2008, Eusébio made it to the GAIS in Sweden for testing, but with the exchange of coaches in his time was sent back.

Contract
 Ceará.

References

1985 births
Brazilian footballers
Living people
Campeonato Brasileiro Série A players
Campeonato Brasileiro Série B players
Ceará Sporting Club players
Guarani FC players
Atlético Clube Goianiense players
Association football defenders
Association football midfielders